Casebook may refer to:
 Casebook, a type of textbook used primarily by students in law schools.
 Casebook PBC, an American public benefit corporation
 Casebook (TV series), an Australian documentary series
 Casebook (video game), the 2008-9 episodic video game
 The Case-Book of Sherlock Holmes, a compilation of Sherlock Holmes novels